Georgia State Route 16 Connector may refer to:

 Georgia State Route 16 Connector (Jefferson–Warren County): a former connector route of State Route 16 that existed in Jefferson, Glascock, and Warren counties
 Georgia State Route 16 Connector (Warren County 1952–1981): a former connector route of State Route 16 that existed in Warren County
 Georgia State Route 16 Connector (Warren County 1982–1989): a former connector route of State Route 16 that existed in Warren County

016 Connector